Uttar Purush is a 1966 Bengali-language film directed by Chitrakar. The film was remade as Uyarndha Manithan (1968) in Tamil, and Anubandham (1984) in Telugu.

Cast
 Vasant Choudhury
 Rabi Ghosh
 Anup Kumar
 Amar Mullick

Soundtrack
All songs are composed by Manabendra Mukhopadhyay and written by Shyamal Gupta. 

"Ekbar Braje Cholo" - Madhuri Chatterjee
"Moner Deule Chirodin" - Sandhya Mukhopadhyay
"Ami Sei Pathe Jai" - Manabendra Mukhopadhyay
"Moroger Ingreji Cock" - Pratima Bandopadhyay

References

External links

1966 films
Bengali-language Indian films
Bengali films remade in other languages
1960s Bengali-language films
Films scored by Manabendra Mukhopadhyay